FC Arsenal Dzerzhinsk is a football team from Dzerzhinsk, Minsk Oblast, Belarus, currently playing in the Belarusian Premier League.

History
The club was founded in 2019 and joined the Belarusian Second League the same year. They won the Second League in their debut season, and made their Belarusian First League debut in 2020.

Current squad
As of March 2023

References

External links

Football clubs in Belarus
Association football clubs established in 2019
2019 establishments in Belarus